Louise M. Shadduck (October 14, 1915 – May 4, 2008), also called the "Lioness of Idaho,"  was an Idaho journalist, political activist, public servant, author, speaker and lobbyist, and the first woman in the United States to serve at the state cabinet level. As Idaho's popular Secretary of Commerce and Development, often leading visiting business executives on horseback adventures in the mountains, she stimulated the state's economy to its ten best years of growth. She was also administrative assistant to two governors, a U.S. Senator and a Congressman.

A historian, she was renowned for her ability to remember names and personal stories. Author of five history books, president of the National Federation of Press Women and independent lobbyist with major accomplishments in forestry and human rights, she was one of Idaho's most decorated and celebrated citizens.

Early life and education 
Louise Shadduck was born in 1915 in Coeur d'Alene, Idaho and raised on a dairy farm in Idaho. Her family had purchased the farm for $700 at the foot of Canfield Mountain, raising vegetables, chickens, goats, and cows. Shadduck drove the family truck as soon as she could reach the pedals, and she and her six brothers took turns driving the family dairy milk truck on its route in the mornings before school. She would perform farm chores and rough-house with her siblings, and also played dolls and helped her mother with the house. She attended Dalton Grade School and high school in Coeur d'Alene in the early 1930s. At one point winning a journalism contest to travel to Alaska, she wrote for her high school newspaper, and was a cheerleader during the Great Depression. In 1969, she received an honorary degree from the University of Idaho.

Career

Early career
Shortly after graduating high school she was hired as a writer for the Spokesman-Review, and afterwards the Coeur d'Alene Press. Shadduck was sent to report on the 1944 Republican National Convention by the Coeur d'Alene Press. At the end of World War II, she founded the Kootenai County Young Republicans in North Idaho. Gaining recognition in that organization, she rejected attempts by the Republican Party to recruit her, instead sticking her to journalism. However, when the Press sent her to Washington, D.C. as an intern for Idaho Senator Henry Dworshak's office, she both wrote stories for the paper and also helped the senator. She also joined Robert Taft's inner circle, after being invited after attending a Young Republicans convention in Milwaukee.

Returning to Boise, Idaho, she accepted a job from the Governor Charles A. Robbins as his publicity assistant. She was quickly promoted to administrative assistant.

She was the first female administrative assistant to an Idaho governor, serving Governor Robins from 1946 until 1950. She left writing for The Press in 1948 but continued to sell freelance stories. The Press published these stories under her "This and That" column. She continued in that office with his successor Leonard B. Jordan, until 1952 when U.S. Senator Henry Dworshak finally convinced her to come to Washington and work for him. In 1952, Shadduck spoke for Eisenhower's and his "I Like Ike" campaign, sharing a head table with the future president. She spoke in support of his peace time nuclear policy in a nationally televised speech at the Republican National Convention.

In 1956 she made a run for United States Congress, against Democrat Gracie Pfost for the First District Congressional seat from Idaho. It was the first time in United States history where both major parties chose female candidates in a congressional race. During this time she also helped Eisenhower in his re-election campaign for US president. She spoke at the Cow Palace in San Francisco in 1956, addressing the GOP National Convention.

State secretary and lobbying

In 1958, she was the first woman in the United States to be a state secretary of commerce and development, when Idaho appointed her to the position Given five employees and a budget of $140,000, soon after losing 45/55 to Pfost, Shadduck was asked by Idaho's Governor Bob Smylie to take over the state's struggling Department of Commerce and Development, giving her a blank slate to do it her way. Under Governor Smylie, she became the first female head of a department when she created and the ran the organization that later became the Department of Commerce and Economic Development. With an office in the State House attic, Shadduck began a strategy of promotion which included back country horseback and fishing trips with business leaders from other states. She brought major Girl Scout and Boy Scout events to the state, implemented development of Farragut State Park and brought other national conventions to Idaho. Her ten-year tenure coincides with Idaho's per capita income rising to its highest point in the century. 
 
Following the defeat of Governor Smylie she became administrative assistant to Idaho's Congressman Orval H. Hansen. After leaving his office she lobbied for Idaho's forest industries and rewrote the timber tax laws to make it profitable for renewable logging on managed private property. Reacting to the arrival of a white supremacist group in northern Idaho, she lobbied effectively for an amendment to malicious harassment laws. That amendment allowed for civil damages to be awarded in cases of malicious harassment and was instrumental in dismantling the supremacist compound. In 1979 she accompanied Senator Frank Church and others on a major trade delegation to China, where she spoke about and promoted cooperation in forestry between the two nations.

Writing and later years 
Shadduck continued to write articles for various Idaho newspapers and publications. In 1966 she was president of Idaho Press Women. From 1971 to 1973 she was president of the National Federation of Press Women and spoke in Israel at the World Association of Women Journalists in a program which also included Israeli Prime Minister Golda Meir.

In May 2008, Idaho Lieutenant Governor Jim Risch named her his North Idaho campaign for his campaign to replace Senator Larry Craig.

Shadduck wrote five books, Idaho Sheep King, Doctors with Buggies, Snowshoes and Planes, At the Edge of the Ice, Rodeo Idaho, and Idaho Rodeo! Her final book, about Victor Dessert and titled The House that Victor Built, was published posthumously and had a publisher's proof version brought to her deathbed in 2008.
 
An amateur artist, she promoted the arts throughout her life. Shadduck had a reputation for never forgetting a name or a person's story. She enjoyed mentoring young people beginning their studies or careers, and her personal friendships are cited as a source of her political influence in Idaho's history. She remained active with full-time speaking engagements until within several months of her death at the age of 92.

Personal life
Shadduck never married, with her great-niece stating in an interview that "it was because no man could keep up with her." In 2005, she organized a family expedition to Enterprise, Oregon and Joseph, Oregon, where her great-grandfather had led a wagon expedition along the Oregon Trail. She died in Coeur d'Alene after a long illness. Upon her death in 2008, she was survived by ten nieces and nephews.

Accolades and awards 
 In 1990, she was chosen as one of 100 "Idahoans who make a difference" by the Idaho Centennial Homecoming Commission.
 Bullard, Mike. Lioness of Idaho: Louise Shadduck and The Power of Polite. (Coeur d'Alene, ID: The Samuel Dow,) 2013.
 Silver and Gold Award from University of Idaho 1988
 Monongahela Forestry Leadership Award from National Forest Products Association
 Silver Anvil Award from Public Relations Society of America
 Idaho Press Women's Woman of Achievement Award 1967 and 1994 
 National Federation of Press Women's President's Award and Hall of Fame
 Outstanding Idahoan from the Idaho Statesman
 Distinguished Member Trophy from Boise Ad Club
 Idaho Hall of Fame, 1996
Outstanding Achievement in the Humanities award by the Idaho Humanities Council in 2000
 Esto Perpetua award of Idaho Historical Society
 Honorary Doctor of Laws, University of Idaho 1969
 Louise Shadduck Office Building, Idaho Department of Lands
 A bronze bust of Shadduck is among the displays rotated into the Idaho State House.

Works 
 Andy Little: Idaho Sheep King. (Caldwell, ID: Caxton Press 1990).
 Doctors with Buggies, Snowshoes and Planes. (Coeur d'Alene, ID: Tamarack, 1993).
 At the Edge of the Ice.  (Coeur d'Alene, ID: Tamarack, 1996).
 Rodeo Idaho. (Coeur d'Alene, ID: Tamarack, 2001).
 The House that Victor Built.  (Spokane: Walsworth Publishing, 2007)
 Unpublished notes and papers in boxes of Shadduck's personal effects held by the University of Idaho Library in Moscow, Idaho, acquisition numbers ma1995-48 and ma2008-23, includes 27 boxes of unsorted and uncatalogued, personal effects.

See also
Women in journalism
List of University of Idaho people

References

Primary sources 
 Carlson, Chis. Medimont Reflections. (Ridenbaugh Press: 2013). Chapter 5 is about the choice of Louise as "Lioness of Idaho".  
 Idaho Oral History Center: Typed Transcript of an Oral History Interview with Louise Shadduck Published 1995. 
 Wolf-Astrauskus, Marianne. Leadership 1937-2013: The First Forty Presidents of the National Federation of Press Women. p. 47.

External links 
C-SPAN Interview, BookTV, Mike Bullard Lioness of Idaho
http://www.ridenbaugh.com/index.php/2012/08/15/carlson-the-lioness-of-idaho/
Author's site

1915 births
2008 deaths
American women journalists
Idaho Republicans
People from Coeur d'Alene, Idaho
University of Idaho alumni
Women in Idaho politics
Journalists from Idaho
20th-century American journalists
20th-century American historians
20th-century American women writers
American women historians
State cabinet secretaries of Idaho
21st-century American women